Machine is the second studio album by American heavy metal band Static-X, released on May 22, 2001, and recorded at Studio 508 (Los Angeles, California). When compared to the band's other albums, Machine features more electronics and industrial effects, and more screamed vocals from Wayne Static. It was also the final Static-X album for eighteen years to feature drummer Ken Jay (although he received songwriting credits on the band's subsequent third album), and the last for four years to feature lead guitarist Koichi Fukuda, who, despite having already left Static-X, was credited as a keyboardist on the album.

Background
While the band toured Wisconsin Death Trip, Wayne Static wrote the entirety of this record by himself on the band's tour bus while the rest of the band partied. Because of this isolated effort, when the band went in to record the record, Static insisted that royalties for the album's sales would not be split an even four ways. This created tension in the band, leading to Fukuda's departure before recording began and his eventual replacement with Tripp Eisen, and Jay's departure just before recording for Shadow Zone began. While Static played all the guitars on the album, Eisen is credited as guitarist, and was involved with the album's photoshoot and promotional materials, the music videos, the world tour for support of the album, and facilitated the Static-X comic book deal.

Promotion
The song "This Is Not" provided the album's first single and music video, and later a second single would be found in "Black and White". The song "Cold" also had a video made for it, and tied in with the film Queen of the Damned. It was featured on the film's soundtrack album, as was the exclusive "Not Meant for Me", performed by Wayne Static who replaced Jonathan Davis who sings it in the movie. The song "Anything but This", a bonus track from the Japanese version, is also found on the Resident Evil soundtrack.

Reception

Critical reaction to the album was mixed, the most positive reviews came from Rolling Stone, NME and Drowned in Sound. Terry Bezer of Drowned in Sound stated in his review that "It is impossible to put into words just how much Static X have progressed since their last effort. True enough, it’s not the most original of sounds (think Ministry crossed with Slipknot) but it does have all the enthusiasm of a bull charging for El Matador’s red cloth and twice the power."

Despite the mixed reviews, Machine sold around 500,000 copies in the USA, making it the band's second most successful album (after Wisconsin Death Trip) and was certified Gold by the RIAA on November 10, 2003, a month after the release of Shadow Zone.

Commercial performance 
Machine debuted at No. 11 on the Billboard 200, selling 83,000 copies in its first week, becoming a chart and first week sales best for the band. The album spent 14 weeks on the chart. While not as successful as the last album, Machine has sold around 500,000 copies in the USA, making it the band's second most successful album (after Wisconsin Death Trip) and was certified Gold by the RIAA on November 10, 2003, a month after the release of Shadow Zone.

Production
In the unreleased Static-X DVD Where the Hell Are We and What Day Is It... This Is Static-X, it was commented that the songs for the album would have guitar solos; however, this didn’t happen.

The opening sample of the track "A Dios Alma Perdida", a synthetic arrangement with a filtered voice speaking in what sounds at times like English (notably closing with an eerie "It's me!"), is from the 1978 film Laserblast. This sample is an abbreviated version of a conversation between the aliens in that movie.

Comic book
A comic book series was created by Chaos! Comics entitled "Static-X Machine." Only one volume was made as Chaos! declared bankruptcy shortly after its release. The comic was packaged with a CD containing one track, "This Is Not (Live)," as well as multimedia content featuring back stage interviews with the band and a live music video of "This Is Not" from the 2002 Machine tour.

Track listing

Chart positions

Album

Singles

Personnel
Static-X
Wayne Static - lead vocals, guitars, keyboards, programming
Tony Campos - bass, backing vocals
Ken Jay - drums
Tripp Rex Eisen - guitars
Koichi Fukuda - guitars, additional keyboards on "Otsego Undead".
Ulrich Wild - keyboards, programming

References

2001 albums
Static-X albums
Warner Records albums